Don't Smile at Me (stylized as  smile at me) is the debut extended play by American singer Billie Eilish, released on August 11, 2017, via Darkroom and Interscope Records. Eilish and her brother Finneas O'Connell wrote most of the material on the EP and were solely responsible for its production. It is an electropop and bedroom pop record with elements of R&B and jazz.

The release of seven singles from 2016 to 2018 supported Don't Smile at Me. "Ocean Eyes" (2016) and "Idontwannabeyouanymore" (2017) were both sleeper hits, charting on the US Billboard Hot 100 and UK Singles Chart. "Bellyache" (2017) reached the top five on the Billboard Bubbling Under Hot 100 chart for a milestone of 32 weeks, while "Copycat" (2017) peaked at number 12 on the chart. Eilish embarked on the Don't Smile at Me Tour and Where's My Mind Tour in 2017 and 2018, respectively, to further promote the EP.

The EP received generally favorable reviews from music critics, with many praising the music and Eilish's vocals. "Hostage" (2017) received a nomination for Best Cinematography at the 2019 MTV Video Music Awards. Don't Smile at Me was commercially successful, reaching number 14 on the US Billboard 200 and number 12 on the UK Albums Chart. It entered the top 10 in many other countries, including Lithuania, where it reached number one.

Re-issued under the title of Don't Smile at Me: December reissue, the EP included a previously released single, "&Burn" (2017) with Vince Staples. The song was certified gold in the United States by the Recording Industry Association of America (RIAA). Don't Smile at Me: Expanded edition was released later. It includes two previously released singles, "Lovely" (2018) with Khalid and "Bitches Broken Hearts" (2018). "Lovely" was commercially successful, peaking at number 64 on the Billboard Hot 100 and number 47 on the UK Singles Chart. "Bitches Broken Hearts" was certified platinum in the US and Canada by the RIAA and Music Canada (MC), respectively.

Background
In July 2017, Eilish told Billboard that "each track off Don't Smile at Me will follow a distinct plot". She explained, "The only tie-together? I'm pretty sure I don’t have any songs that are about how much I love someone. They're all either about like, 'I hate you,' or 'you make me hate me'."

Eilish spoke about the EP's title: "My EP is called Don't Smile at Me for a lot of reasons, but one of them would be when [someone tells you], 'Smile. Why aren't you smiling? It's so much more beautiful when you smile.' Everyone's taught to smile. Girls are like, 'Look happy, look like you're having fun!' I'm not gonna look like anybody except what I am. I want to impress myself."  Eilish and her brother Finneas O'Connell wrote most of the material for Don't Smile at Me. Finneas produced the EP in its entirety. Studio personnel John Greenham and Rob Kinelski handled the mastering and mixing, respectively.

Music and lyrics
Don't Smile at Me is primarily an electropop and bedroom pop record, with R&B and jazz influences. The EP opens with "Copycat", a hip hop-influenced electronica and pop track. It features minimalist production consisting of a bass guitar and piano. The song is Eilish's response to people she felt kept copying everything she was doing. The following track, "Idontwannabeyouanymore", is a pop and R&B song, with a jazz and neo soul-influenced melody. The track features Eilish singing about self-doubt and low self-esteem. According to Baeble Music's Olivia Lewis, "My Boy" begins with a "chiller, jazz-like vibe, and a layer of darkness and mystery". It features hip hop-influenced production, using a hi-hat and keyboard. Musically, the track is a pop song.

With "Watch", described as a pop ballad, Eilish sends a message to her former lover, saying she is leaving their toxic relationship. The track begins with the sound of a match strike that continues throughout the song as its main beat. "Party Favor" is a folk track with Eilish playing the ukulele. The song addresses Eilish's break up with her boyfriend on his birthday with a phone call. "Bellyache" is a mid-tempo electropop and R&B song with influences of hip hop, deep house and Latin macabre in its instrumentation. The song's lyrics were written from the perspective of a psychopath who kills those close to her, including her friends and lover.

"Ocean Eyes" is a dream pop, pop, synth-pop, indie pop and R&B ballad. The song features percussion, bass guitar and a synthesizer. "Ocean Eyes" is a love letter to Eilish's crush with her lover's "ocean" eyes. Don't Smile at Me closes with "Hostage", a stripped-down pop track. Lyrically, the track is about an intense love that Eilish feels for someone and an overwhelming desire she has for them. The December re-issue of the EP contains one additional track; "&Burn" with Vince Staples——a hip hop-influenced pop track.  "[B]ooming kick drums" and "velvety keys" support the track. Like "Watch", the song starts with the sound of a match striking and uses it for the main beat. When Eilish and Finneas were recording the song, it was titled "Watch & Burn". The track later became two separate songs—"Watch" and "&Burn".

The expanded edition of Don't Smile at Me contains two extra tracks. "Lovely", featuring Khalid, is a chamber pop-based stripped back ballad. The track features minimalist production consisting of a piano, violin strings provided by Madison Leinster, and percussion, as Eilish and Khalid sing about the feeling of being trapped inside of one's own mind. "Bitches Broken Hearts" is an R&B track. Emmit Fenn handled additional production of the track, the first song by Eilish to feature production by someone other than her brother. Lyrically, the song delves into the aftermath of a breakup, with Eilish pretending she no longer needs or cares about her former lover.

Promotion

Singles and other songs

"Ocean Eyes" was originally released on November 18, 2015, via SoundCloud. On November 18, 2016, it was re-released as the lead single from Don't Smile at Me. Although the song did not chart initially, it became a sleeper hit in 2019 after Eilish released her debut studio album When We All Fall Asleep, Where Do We Go?, reaching number 72 on the UK Singles Chart and number 84 on the US Billboard Hot 100. The Australian Recording Industry Association (ARIA) certified the song quadruple platinum in Australia. It received triple platinum certifications in the United States, Canada and Denmark from the Recording Industry Association of America (RIAA), Music Canada (MC) and IFPI Denmark, respectively. The song spawned two music videos; Megan Thompson directed the first released on March 24, 2016. The second is a dance performance video released on November 22, 2016. A remix EP for the track was released on January 14, 2017. It includes remixes by Astronomyy, Blackbear, Goldhouse, and Cautious Clay.

"Bellyache" was released on February 24, 2017, as the second single from Don't Smile at Me. The song was also a sleeper hit, reaching number three on the US Bubbling Under Hot 100 chart for a milestone of 32 weeks, and number 79 on the UK Singles Chart. It was certified double platinum in the US, Australia, and in Mexico by the Asociación Mexicana de Productores de Fonogramas y Videogramas (AMPROFON). Miles and AJ directed an accompanying music video released on March 22, 2017. Marian Hill remixed "Bellyache" and released it on May  5, 2017. "Watch" was released as the third single from Don't Smile at Me on June 30, 2017. Megan Park directed the song's music video which was released on September 18, 2017. The track was certified platinum in the US, Canada, and Australia. "Copycat" was released as the EP's fourth single on July 14, 2017. Sofi Tukker remixed it and released it on January 12, 2018. The song peaked at number 12 on the Bubbling Under Hot 100 chart; it ultimately was certified in the US.

"Idontwannabeyouanymore" was released as the fifth single from Don't Smile at Me on July 21, 2017. It charted at number 96 on the Billboard Hot 100 and number 78 on the UK Singles Chart. The track was certified double platinum in the US. A vertical video for the track was released to Spotify in December 2017. The EP's sixth single, "My Boy", was released on July 28, 2017. The song received a remix by TroyBoi entitled "MyBoi", released on March 9, 2018. "My Boy" was certified platinum in the US. "&Burn", featuring American rapper Vince Staples, was released as a single on December 15, 2017 and later included on the Don't Smile at Me: December reissue. The song was certified gold in the US. "Party Favor" was released on an exclusive pink 7-inch vinyl as the seventh and final single from Don't Smile at Me on April 21, 2018, coinciding with that year's Record Store Day. A cover of "Hotline Bling", originally performed and written by Canadian rapper Drake, was released as the B-side. "Party Favor" was certified gold in the US.

"Lovely", featuring Khalid, was released as the lead single for 13 Reasons Why: Season 2 (Music from the Original TV Series) on April 19, 2018, and later included on the Don't Smile at Me: Expanded edition. Taylor Cohen and Matty Peacock directed its music video. The song reached number 64 on the Billboard Hot 100 and number 47 on the UK Singles Chart. It was certified octuple platinum in Australia and Canada, triple platinum in Mexico and in Poland (certified by the Polish Society of the Phonographic Industry (PSPI)), and double platinum in the US and New Zealand—certified by Recorded Music NZ (RMNZ). "Bitches Broken Hearts" was originally released as a standalone single on March 30, 2018. It was ultimately included in the Expanded Edition. The song was certified platinum in the US and Canada. Despite not being released as a single, Henry Scholfield produced a music video for "Hostage". It was first released exclusively via Apple Music on July 11, 2018. The video was later uploaded to Eilish's YouTube channel on October 8, 2018. "Hostage" was ultimately certified platinum in the US and Canada.

Tours
To promote the EP, Eilish embarked on the Don't Smile at Me Tour and Where's My Mind Tour during 2017 and 2018. In Europe, Eilish would open with "Bellyache". Eilish would then sing "&Burn" without Staples. It would begin with the original arrangement before the beat drops and Eilish would break into dance. Eilish would finish with "Copycat", red lights would flash as she sang it. The staff of Billboard magazine praised Eilish's performance at The Bowery Ballroom. Lyndsay Havens described the performance as "explosive" but "at times tender, and entirely exciting". She added the performance was "the type of show where you are acutely aware that the artist you are currently watching will outgrow the venue they are playing almost immediately". The staff of The Gazette felt Eilish "wants to bring the audience into her world, creating an experience for them".

Reception

Critical reception

Don't Smile at Me was met with generally favorable reviews by music critics. Kristin Smith of Plugged In said of the EP, "A fusion of multiple genres, sounds and styles, these nine tracks capture the young singer's undeniably engaging perspective and personality. We hear the honest confessions of a teenager who has known heartbreak, self-loathing and love. Don't Smile at Me is dreamy and depressing, enchanting and haunting. And it warrants both praise and caution." Nicole Almeida of Atwood Magazine wrote Don't Smile at Me was a "powerful declaration", and a "statement coming from the mouth of someone who knows who she is. The title perfectly embodies the strength and ambition of Eilish's debut EP and of Eilish herself as an artist." Robert Christgau, writing for Vice, commended Eilish's "still-fragile melodies and still-pure voice" on the EP, but considered the songwriting and production to be less accomplished than that of her debut single When We All Fall Asleep, Where Do We Go?. Tom Hull mentioned that Don't Smile at Me singles are "more pop", and more "easily distinguished from the filler". Brenton Blanchet of Spin magazine lauded the EP, saying it was the "first sample of what Eilish could create in her bedroom", saying the "airy and atmospheric project showcased pop craft beyond her age".

Commercial performance
Don't Smile at Me became a sleeper hit in the US, debuting at number 185 on the US Billboard 200 a month and a half after its release. The EP later broke into the top 100 in the week ending May 31, 2018, its 21st week on the chart, at number 97 with 7,000 album-equivalent units. Don't Smile at Me reached the top 40 of the Billboard 200 in the week ending July 28 at number 38 with 12,000 units, including 10,000 streaming equivalent album units, before peaking at number 14 in its 56th charting week for the issue dated January 26, 2019. As of April 2019, the EP has sold 947,000 album-equivalent units in the US and has also generated more than 1.2 billion on-demand audio streams for its tracks. Don't Smile at Me was more successful outside the United States. The EP peaked at number 12 on the UK Albums Chart. In Australia, it peaked at number six on the ARIA Charts. It was most successful in Lithuania, peaking at number one on the chart. In early 2019, Eilish became the youngest artist to hit one billion streams on Spotify with Don't Smile at Me.

Track listing

Notes
 All tracks are stylized in all lowercase, except for "Copycat", which is stylized in all caps, and "MyBoi".
"&Burn" is an alternate version of "Watch".

Personnel
Credits adapted from the album's liner notes.
 Billie Eilish – vocals, songwriter, ukulele 
 Finneas – production, engineering, songwriter, mixing (tracks 5, 7)
 John Greenham – mastering
 Rob Kinelski – mixing (all tracks except 5, 7)

Charts

Weekly charts

Year-end charts

Decade-end charts

Certifications

References

External links

2017 debut EPs
Albums produced by Finneas O'Connell
Billie Eilish EPs
Electropop EPs
Indie pop EPs
Interscope Records EPs